The Punjab Safe Cities Authority (PSCA) ( or PSCA) established under the Punjab Safe Cities Ordinance 2015, is an autonomous Government body that aims to improve public safety and security in the Punjab, Pakistan.

Background of Punjab Safe Cities Authority (PSCA) 
In contemporary world the idea of development is not just to enhance per capita income but to increase the "Quality of Life" of the people. Despite different opinions of experts in measuring "Quality of Life" the center of discussion is well-being along with the level of satisfaction of citizens. Safety and Security of citizens is one of the most vital factor among other major factors such as health, education and environment associated with the "Quality of Life". No country can prosper and grow in terms of economy without providing the sense of public safety and security among its people.

The founder of Pakistan Quaid-e-Azam Muhammad Ali Jinnah said on August 11, 1947: “You will no doubt agree with me that the first duty of a government is to maintain law and order, so that the life, property, and religious beliefs of its subjects are fully protected by the State. If we want to make this great State of Pakistan happy and prosperous we should wholly and solely concentrate on the well-being of the people, and especially of the masses and the poor”.

Modern World Challenges 
The evolution of contemporary society has brought along a scope of various and complex social and ecological challenges. The world has seen various powerful changes over the most recent couple of years like expanding paces of the urbanization, mix of worldwide markets and economies, worldwide movement and innovations. Aside from making priceless chances, these progressions have brought forth new difficulties which cannot be overlooked. Worldwide clashes have offered rise to another flood of dangers, both national and universal. These progressions have additionally affected the security structure of various states. The danger of terrorism and rising militancy among various gatherings have made a disturbing situation for some nations. The problem of handling terrorism currently shapes the center of national security arrangements of numerous nations. The recent pressures made by a changed security condition have featured just as uncovered the constrained limit of the existing foundation to manage the new range of dangers, imperiling security and well-being of the public.

Integration of Safety and Security Administration Systems 
In customary security administration system, separate offices and specialists were in charge of managing diverse security circumstances, for example, fire security, interruption recognition, traffic blockage, urban violence and catastrophic events like floods, earthquakes and more. However, current innovation and video monitoring system was utilized for observing purposes, this framework did not work as a brought together strong unit to manage crisis circumstances. Considering the Safe City idea, these advances are run by a focal control and administration which is engaged with the constant checking of potential crisis circumstances and quickly reacts to them to limit harm and expenses. The administration fills in as a center point of information through which data is spread and input is gathered. As such, it is a multipurpose answer for all security issues seen by a city and is controlled by central administration. It may be said in this manner that the Safe City idea exemplifies a one-stop-shop answer for every one of the issues identified for the well-being of the public. It empowers unique frameworks to arrange and work together with each other to build up an instrument of effective policing for current urban areas. Its different advantages incorporate a decrease in reaction time in an even of crises, quick service conveyance, constant checking of potential security dangers at key areas, convenient goals of traffic-related issues like mishaps, blockage and stifle focuses, successful management of crowd and uproar control.

Establishment of Punjab Safe Cities Authority (PSCA) 
Considering the Safe Cities idea and to address the security difficulties of a cutting edge urban condition, a self-governing authority was set up under the Punjab Safe Cities Ordinance 2015 for the improvement, establishment and maintenance of Integrated Command, Control and Communications Program all through the area. The Ordinance was drafted and endorsed on July 7, 2015, with its overseeing body, official and the executive’s arrangement. It was chosen to name a full-time Managing Director with talented staff to successfully deal with the undertakings of the Authority.

The Working Model of Safe City Centre 
Safe cities vision is to make an Integrated Command, Control and Communication Program (IC3) which gathers and disseminates data and information with various sources for example government offices, executives of traffic management, intelligence agencies and other private and public entities. Also, to utilize this data to grow progressively successful and effective reactions to any sort of security risk. Utilizing cutting edge technology, video surveillance and communication systems, it manages a variety of security threats progressively. Aside from upgrading the capacity to react rapidly to a crisis circumstance, it incredibly diminishes the pressure on state and its assets as data is stored centrally and activities are coordinated through a central authority. The safe city speaks to brilliant policing where the capability of cutting edge innovations is outfit and the ability of law administration groups is upgraded so as to make urban environments safe.

E-Challan (e-ticketing) 
Punjab Safe Cities Authority (PSCA) has launched the E-Challan system in Lahore on the directives of the Lahore High Court (LHC). The response of the citizens towards EChallan is welcoming. This system with the help of modern Automatic Vehicle Number Plate Recognition (ANPR) cameras, identifies the violators of the traffic rules, which Punjab Safe City Authority (PSCA) installed across the Lahore. The Electronic Ticket (EChallan) is sent to the violators’ addresses registered against their vehicle IDs, containing the information along with pictorial evidence regarding how the driver violated the traffic rules. The PSCA has also launched online portal for the citizens to check Echallan by giving vehicle registration number and CNIC.

References

External links 
 

Organisations based in Lahore
Civic and political organisations of Pakistan
Local government organizations
2015 establishments in Pakistan
Organizations established in 2016
Public safety
Government agencies of Punjab, Pakistan